Roger Madsen is an American attorney and politician who served as the director of the Idaho Department of Labor. Madsen had previously served as a member of the Idaho Senate from 1988 to 1990 and 1992 to 1994.

Early life and education 
Madsen is a native of Pullman, Washington. He earned a Bachelor of Arts in political science and French from Washington State University, a Master of Arts in political science from Brigham Young University, a Master of Business Administration from the Thunderbird School of Global Management at Arizona State University, and Juris Doctor from the J. Reuben Clark Law School.

Career 
From 1976 to 1980, Madsen was an attorney at the Idaho Department of Employment. Madsen was first elected to the Idaho Legislature in 1987. He served one term and was defeated for re-election in 1990. Madsen was later elected to his old seat for another term. In the 1994 Republican primary, Madsen defeated Jim Risch. During his time in the Idaho Senate, Madsen worked as an attorney and business consultant.

In 1995, Madsen was appointed to serve Director of the Idaho Department of Labor by then-Governor Phil Batt. Madsen retired as director in 2013 to pursue philanthropic work in Morocco. Madsen was succeeded by Ken Edmunds.

References

State cabinet secretaries of Idaho
Republican Party Idaho state senators
Year of birth missing (living people)
Living people
Place of birth missing (living people)
20th-century American politicians
Idaho lawyers
People from Pullman, Washington
Washington State University alumni
Brigham Young University alumni
Arizona State University alumni
J. Reuben Clark Law School alumni